Jai Karnataka is a 1989 Indian Kannada-language superhero film, directed and produced by Dwarakish. The film stars Ambareesh, Rajani, Jr Narasimharaju and Mukhyamantri Chandru in the lead roles. The film has musical score by Vijayanand. The film was a remake of the Hindi film Mr. India.

Cast

Ambareesh as Arun
Rajani as Seema
Jr. Narasimharaju as Panchanga
Mukhyamantri Chandru as Teja
Captain Raju as Mogambo
Shivaram
Rathnakar
Chethan Ramarao
Master Abhishek
Pranaya Murthy

Soundtrack 
"Hawa Hawaii" - S. Janaki
"I Love You" - S. P. Balasubrahmanyam, Vani Jairam

Release

References

1989 films
1980s Kannada-language films
Kannada remakes of Hindi films
Indian science fiction films
1980s Indian superhero films
Films about invisibility
Films with screenplays by Salim–Javed
Films directed by Dwarakish
Films scored by Vijayanand
1980s science fiction films
Indian superhero films